Rakurakuen is a Hiroden station on Hiroden Miyajima Line, located in Rakurakuen, Saeki-ku, Hiroshima. There was an amusement park called "Rakurakuen-yuenchi" operated by Hiroden.

Routes
From Rakurakuen Station, there is one of Hiroden Streetcar routes.
 Hiroshima Station - Hiroden-miyajima-guchi Route

Connections
█ Miyajima Line

Saeki-kuyakusyo-mae (Saeki Ward Office) — Rakurakuen — Sanyo-joshidai-mae

Around station
Hiroshima Institute of Technology
Hiroshima Senior High School, Junior High School attached to H.I.T.
Saeki-ku sports center

History
Opened as "Shiohama" on December 1, 1935.
Renamed to "Rakurakuen" on September 8, 1936.
Renamed to "Rakurakuen-yuenchi(amusement park)" on July 20, 1965.
Renamed to "Rakurakuen" on September 1, 1971. - the amusement park was closed.

See also
Hiroden Streetcar Lines and Routes

References

Rakurakuen Station
Railway stations in Japan opened in 1935